申 may refer to:
The ninth of the Earthly Branches
Monkey (zodiac), the ninth sign of the Chinese zodiac
Shēn (surname), a Chinese surname
Shin (Korean surname)
Abbreviation for Application for employment